Sataspes negrosiana is a species of moth of the family Sphingidae. It is known from the Philippines.

References

Sataspes (moth)
Moths described in 2009